Badeleh Darreh (also Romanized as Bādeleh Darreh) is a village in Shohada Rural District, Yaneh Sar District, Behshahr County, Mazandaran Province, Iran. At the 2006 census, its population was 69, in 25 families.

References 

Populated places in Behshahr County